DC Entertainment is an American entertainment company that was founded in September 2009 and was based in Burbank, California. The company is a subsidiary of Warner Bros. Discovery that manages its DC Comics units and characters in other units, as they work with other Warner Bros. units. It also delves into those units within their flagship the DC Extended Universe (DCEU).

In April 2022, following the merger of parent company WarnerMedia with Discovery, Inc., DC Entertainment was reported to be reorganized into its own vertical unit rather than being handled by other Warner Bros. subsidiaries on its behalf.

History

Formation 
In September 9, 2009, Warner Bros. announced that DC Comics would become a subsidiary of DC Entertainment, Inc., with Diane Nelson, President of Warner Premiere, becoming president of the newly formed holding company and DC Comics President and Publisher Paul Levitz moving to the position of Contributing Editor and Overall Consultant there. Warner Bros. and DC Comics have been owned by the same company since.

On February 18, 2010, DC Entertainment named Jim Lee and Dan DiDio as Co-Publishers of DC Comics, Geoff Johns as Chief Creative Officer, John Rood as EVP (Executive Vice President) of Sales, Marketing and Business Development, and Patrick Caldon as EVP of Finance and Administration.

Property Expansion 
In October 2013, DC Entertainment announced that the DC Comics offices were going to move in 2015 from New York City to the headquarters of Warner Bros. in Burbank, California. The other units, animation, film, television and portfolio planning, had preceded DC Comics by moving there in 2010.

DC Entertainment announced its first franchise, the DC Super Hero Girls universe, in April 2015 with multi-platform content, toys and apparel to start appearing in 2016.

Warner Bros. Pictures reorganized in May 2016 to have genre-responsible film executives, thus DC Entertainment franchise films under Warner Bros. were placed under a newly created division, DC Films, created under Warner Bros. executive vice president Jon Berg and DC chief content officer Geoff Johns. This was done in the same vein as Marvel Studios in unifying DC-related filmmaking under a single vision and clarifying the greenlighting process. Johns also kept his existing role at DC Comics. Johns was promoted to DC president and CCO with the addition of his DC Films while still reporting to DCE President Nelson. In August 2016, Amit Desai was promoted from senior vice president, marketing & global franchise management to exec vice president, business and marketing strategy, direct-to-consumer and global franchise management.

Digital distribution 
DC Comics are available in digital form through several sources. Free services: In 2015, Hoopla Digital became the first library-based digital system to distribute DC Comics.

In April 2017, DC announced an upcoming streaming service with Warner Bros. Digital Networks, which was to feature original live-action and animated series based on DC characters and franchises, such as Titans and Young Justice: Outsiders. The service, later announced as DC Universe, would launch in September 2018, and also feature access to classic DC television series and digital comics.

With frustration over DC Films not matching Marvel Studios' results and Berg wanting to step back to being a producer in January 2018, it was announced that Warner Bros. executive Walter Hamada was appointed president of DC film production. After a leave of absence starting in March 2018, Diane Nelson resigned as president of DC Entertainment. The company's executive management were to report to WB Chief Digital Officer Thomas Gewecke until a new president was selected.

DC Entertainment, LLC
In June 2018, Johns was also moved out of his position as chief creative officer and DC Entertainment president for a writing and producing deal with the DC and WB companies. Jim Lee added DC Entertainment chief creative officer title to his DC co-publisher post. In September 2018, DC became part of the newly-founded Warner Bros. Global Brands and Franchises division overseen by President Pam Lifford. Paid services were Google Play and ComiXology. In January 2019 it was reported that 7 of the DC's 240 person workforce were laid off, including several vice presidents.

In August 2020, DC publisher Jim Lee announced that all video content from DC Universe would migrate to HBO Max, with the majority of the staff of DC Universe having been laid off. In September 2020, it was announced that DC Universe's original programming and future productions would be folded into WarnerMedia's new streaming service HBO Max.

In January 2021, the remainder of the service would become a comics-centric service known as DC Universe Infinite. The service would feature DC titles six months after their retail release date (comparable to Marvel Unlimited), early access to DC Comics' digital-first titles, exclusive comics created for the service, and access to 24,000 titles in DC's back catalog.

Warner Bros. Discovery subsidiary 
On April 14, 2022, after the merger of parent company WarnerMedia with Discovery Inc., it was reported that the company was exploring a restructuring of DC Entertainment into a "solidified content vertical" more akin to Marvel, with its film, television, and video game development brought directly under DC with a central leader, rather than being handled by other Warner Bros. subsidiaries on its behalf.

As part of the reconstruction, the DC Comics website was relaunched under the "DC.com" URL (note: no longer "DC COMICS"). The update featured more digital experiences, such as weekly video content, allowing fans access to DC Universe Infinite through the same user profile.

Units

Active 
 MAD
 DC Comics
 DC Black Label
 DC's Young Animal
 WildStorm
 Sandman Universe
 Hill House Comics
 Wonder Comics
 DC Graphic Novels for Kids
 DC Graphic Novels for Young Adults
 DC Universe Infinite

Defunct 

 DC Universe (SVOD) - shut down with catalog absorbed into HBO Max; spun off into DC Universe Infinite

Executives

Presidents

 Diane Nelson (September 9, 2009 – June 6, 2018)
 Geoff Johns (2016–2018)
 Anne Leung DePies, Senior Vice President (2022–present)

Others

 Geoff Johns, Chief Creative Officer, DC Comics (2010–2018)
 Jim Lee, Chief Creative Officer, DC Comics (June 2018–present)
 Amit Desai, Executive Vice President (2016–2019)

Productions

See also 

 DC Studios
 DC Extended Universe
 DC Universe (franchise)
 Lists of DC Comics characters
 List of current DC Comics publications
 List of unproduced DC Comics projects
 List of video games based on DC Comics

Notes

References

External links 
 

 
American companies established in 2009
2009 establishments in California
Companies based in Burbank, California
Entertainment companies based in California
Entertainment companies established in 2009
Mass media companies established in 2009
Warner Bros. Discovery subsidiaries